Andrews McMeel Publishing, LLC (formerly Andrews, McMeel and Parker (1975–1986) and Andrews and McMeel (1986–1997)) is a company that publishes books, calendars, and related toys.  It is a part of Andrews McMeel Universal (which comprises AMP, Andrews McMeel Syndication, and AMUSE).

Andrews McMeel is the general publisher of books of comic strips produced by Andrews McMeel Syndication including The Far Side, Calvin and Hobbes and FoxTrot. However, the company also produces book collections for some comic strips which are owned by other syndicates.

History
Founded in 1970 by Jim Andrews and John McMeel, entered the book business with the 1973 acquisition of Sheed and Ward. The publishing arm began in 1975 as Andrews McMeel Publishing. (The Sheed and Ward name and backlist were divested).

References

External links
 

Companies based in Kansas City, Missouri
Book publishing companies based in Missouri
Publishing companies established in 1975
1975 establishments in Missouri